Firefall (December 7, 1992) is a collection of poetry by Mona Van Duyn (1921-2004).  It was the last collection of poems to be published during the poet's lifetime.

External links
Amazon listing for Firefall

1993 poetry books
American poetry collections